The Medal for the Best Shot in the British Army, Infantry, was instituted by Queen Victoria in 1869 and was awarded annually from 1870 to 1882 to the best shot of the Infantry of the British Army, including the Royal Engineers and the Colonial Corps.

In 1923, the medal was re-introduced by King George V and designated the King's Medal for Champion Shots in the Military Forces. It could now be awarded to the champions of Army marksmanship competitions, held under battle conditions at annual central meetings in the United Kingdom, the British Dominions, Colonies and India. Early participating countries were Australia, Canada, India, New Zealand, South Africa and Southern Rhodesia.

The number of countries which awarded the King's Medal for Champion Shots in the Military Forces grew to twelve by the mid-20th century, but as some countries gained independence from the United Kingdom or instituted their own equivalent awards, that number dwindled to the present three: the United Kingdom, Jamaica and New Zealand.

An Air Force version of the medal, the Queen's Medal for Champion Shots of the Air Forces, was instituted in 1953. This was followed by the institution of the Queen's Medal for Champion Shots of the New Zealand Naval Forces in 1958 and the Queen's Medal for Champion Shots of the Royal Navy and Royal Marines in 1966.

Institution
Queen Victoria authorised the creation of the Medal for the Best Shot in the British Army, Infantry, by Royal Warrant dated 30 April 1869. The medal, initially struck in bronze and from 1872 in silver, was inscribed with the year in which won and the winner's name, number and regiment. It became the winner's property and could be worn by him during the whole of his service. From 1870, the medal was awarded annually, along with a £20 Prize for Skill at Arms, to the best shot of the Infantry of the British Army, including the Royal Engineers and the Colonial Corps. With only thirteen medals won, award of the medal and the £20 prize ceased after 1882. A £5 prize and a crowned badge of crossed carbines or rifles, worked in gold and worn upon the left arm, was approved to replace it on 10 June 1884.

After a 41-year lapse, the medal was re-introduced by King George V in 1923 and designated the King's Medal for Champion Shots in the Military Forces. The medal could now be awarded to the champions of Army marksmanship competitions, held under battle firing conditions at annual central meetings in the United Kingdom, India, the British Dominions and the Colony of Southern Rhodesia. Early participating countries were Australia, Canada, India, New Zealand, South Africa and Southern Rhodesia.

A date clasp was also introduced in 1923, for award with the medal to first recipients as well as, without a medal, to champions who had already been awarded the medal. The clasp is inscribed with the year of the award and is designed to be attached to the medal's suspension bar. The institution of the clasp was followed in 1926 with the provision that a rosette may be worn on the ribbon bar to indicate the award of each subsequent clasp.

Award criteria
All medal contenders have to be serving members of the Regular Army, Army Emergency Reserve, Territorial Army, or Local Militia and Volunteer Forces in the countries concerned. Members of independent Naval and Air Forces, while not excluded from the competition, could therefore not be awarded the medal even though they won the championship. This regulation had consequences on two occasions.

 The 1938 competition in Canada was won by Leading Aircraftman T.W. Gregory, who had won the medal in 1935 as a Sergeant in the Canadian Regular Army. In 1938, since he was a member of the Royal Canadian Air Force by then, he was ineligible to be awarded the clasp and the medal was awarded to the runner-up. An Air Force version of the medal, the Queen's Medal for Champion Shots of the Air Forces, was instituted by Queen Elizabeth II in 1953. In 1955, Gregory won this new medal and became the only person to have won Queen's Medals in two different Arms of the Service. 
 The 1962 competition in Rhodesia was won by Corporal Technician B.T. Gilpin, a member of the Royal Rhodesian Air Force. Despite protests from the Army commanders, the Minister of Defence presented Gilpin with the Army medal. As a result of the controversy, Rhodesia sought and was granted the Crown's permission to introduce the Queen's Medal for Champion Shots of the Air Forces. The first Rhodesian Air Force award was backdated to 1962 and the first two medals were presented in December 1963, one to Gilpin and the other to the Air Force champion for 1963. Gilpin's 1962 Army medal was returned and the 1962 Army runner-up, Inspector D. Hollingworth, was awarded a second clasp to his existing medal.

The institution of the Queen's Medal for Champion Shots of the Air Forces was followed by the institution of the Queen's Medal for Champion Shots of the New Zealand Naval Forces in 1958 and the Queen's Medal for Champion Shots of the Royal Navy and Royal Marines in 1966.

Order of wear
In the order of wear prescribed by the British Central Chancery of the Orders of Knighthood, the Queen's/King's Medal for Champion Shots in the Military Forces takes precedence after the Queen's Medal for Champion Shots of the New Zealand Naval Forces and before the Queen's Medal for Champion Shots of the Air Forces.

Participating countries
In the United Kingdom, the medal is at present awarded annually to the winner of the Regular Army championship - the Army Operational Shooting Competition.

From 1935, a second medal could be awarded annually in the United Kingdom, to the champion shot of the Territorial Army. In order to also be eligible for the medal, members of the Supplementary Reserve were included in the competition's definition of the Territorial Army from 1936. The competition to determine the annual medal winner for the part-time forces is held during the National Rifle Association's annual Imperial Meeting at the National Shooting Centre, Bisley.

Outside the United Kingdom, the number of British Commonwealth countries which awarded the medal grew to eleven by the mid-20th century. This number decreased over the ensuing years, however, since some countries became republics and stopped awarding the medal, while others replaced the medal with new domestic versions. The tables below list the recipients of the medal in the respective countries.

Australia

The first King's Medal Competition in the Commonwealth of Australia was held in 1924 and the first medal to an Australian was won by Temporary Quartermaster and Honorary Captain W.C.G. Ruddock of the Australian Instructional Corps. In 1988, the Champion Shots Medal was instituted in Australia and the Queen's Medal for Champion Shots in the Military Forces ceased to be awarded.

Canada
The first King's Medal Competition in Canada was held for the Canadian Regular Force in 1923 and the first medal to a Canadian was won by Warrant Officer Class 1 F.J. Goodhouse of the Royal Canadian Army Service Corps. From 1963, two Queen's Medals for Champion Shots in the Military Forces were awarded annually in Canada, the second to a member of either the Royal Canadian Mounted Police or the Canadian Reserve Force. The first of these was won by Lance Sergeant T.A.P. Richardson of the Victoria Rifles of Canada. On 28 August 1991 the Queen's Medal for Champion Shot, a distinct Canadian version of the medal, was instituted and from 1992 the British version of the Queen's Medal for Champion Shots in the Military Forces ceased to be awarded.

Ceylon
The first Queen's Medal Competition in Ceylon was held in 1954 and the first medal to a Ceylonese was won by Captain C.L.A.P. Direkze of the Ceylon Light Infantry Regiment. The medal was awarded in Ceylon only three more times, in 1957, 1958 and 1966.

Ghana
The Queen's Medal Competition was held in Ghana only once, in 1959, and was won by Sergeant M.P. Konkomba of the 2nd Battalion Ghana Regiment of Infantry. The competition and award was abolished by Ghana in 1963.

India
The first King's Medal Competition in India was held in 1924 and the first medal to an Indian was won by Naik S.S. Lama of the 2nd King Edward VII's Own Gurkha Rifles (The Sirmoor Rifles). British soldiers were also entitled to compete for the medal while stationed in India, and won it on several occasions. The last competition was held in 1938, before it was interrupted by the outbreak of the Second World War in 1939. In 1947, India was granted independence and the medal ceased to be awarded.

Jamaica
Before 1963, the Jamaican competition was an annual local shooting competition which did not form part of the Queen's Medal Competitions. The first Queen's Medal Competition in Jamaica was held in 1963 and the first medal to a Jamaican was won by Private J.E.P. Daley of the 1st Battalion, The Jamaica Regiment. The medal can still be awarded annually in Jamaica.

New Zealand
The first King's Medal Competition in New Zealand was held in 1923 and the first medal to a New Zealander was won by Staff Sergeant-Major A.J. Moore of the New Zealand Permanent Staff. Although the competition was interrupted on a few occasions, the longest period being from 1931 to 1954 due to the discontinuance of the Combined Services Small Arms Association Annual Meetings and the Second World War, the medal is still being awarded annually in New Zealand.

Pakistan
The first Queen's Medal Competition in Pakistan was held in 1950 and the first medal to a Pakistani was won by Jemadar S.P. Akbar of the South Waziristan Scouts. The competition was not held again after 1956.

Rhodesia

The first King's Medal Competition in Southern Rhodesia was held in 1926 and the first medal to a Rhodesian was won by Sergeant F.G. Elliott of the British South Africa Police. From 1940 to 1947 the competition was interrupted by the Second World War. After Rhodesia's Unilateral Declaration of Independence on 11 November 1965, the competition and the award of the Queen's Medal for Champion Shots in the Military Forces continued for another four years, until Rhodesia severed its ties with the British Crown on 2 March 1970 and, in that same year, instituted the President%E2%80%99s_Medal_for_Shooting_(Rhodesia) of the Security Forces.

South Africa
The first King's Medal Competition in the Union of South Africa was held in 1924 and the first medal to a South African was won by G.W. Church of the 7th Infantry (Kimberley Regiment). The competition did not take place in 1926 and was interrupted from 1940 to 1947 by the Second World War. The last medal was awarded in 1961, the year that South Africa became a republic. From 1962, the British medal was replaced by the Commandant General's Medal, which could be awarded to champions from any of the three Arms of the Service.

Trinidad and Tobago
The Queen's Medal Competition was introduced in Trinidad and Tobago in 1970, but the first medal was only awarded in 1972, to Lance Corporal F.P. Marcano of the 1st Battalion Trinidad and Tobago Regiment. The medal was won only two more times, in 1973 and 1975.

Description
The first few medals of the original Queen Victoria version were struck in bronze, but in 1872 it was ordained that it should be of silver. It is a disk,  in diameter, with a raised rim on each side and suspended from a straight silver bar, swivelling on some versions. On the Queen Victoria version, the suspender is affixed to the medal by means of a double-toe claw and a pin through the upper edge of the medal. On the Kings' versions and the first Queen Elizabeth II version, the attachment is by a single-toe claw. On the second Queen Elizabeth II version, the suspension is either riveted or welded to the top of the medal.

Obverse
The obverse bears the effigy of the reigning monarch. Seven versions of the medal have been awarded.

 The original Queen Victoria version of 1869 has her diademed and veiled effigy, facing left, and is circumscribed "VICTORIA REGINA". It was designed by British medallist L.C. Wyon.
 The first King George V version of 1923 shows him in Field Marshal's uniform, facing left, and is circumscribed "GEOGIVS V BRITT: OMN: REX ET IND: IMP:".
 The second King George V version was awarded from 1933 to 1936 and shows him crowned and in coronation robes, facing left. It is circumscribed "GEORGIVS•V•D•G•BRITT•OMN•REX•ET•INDIÆ•IMP•".
 The first King George VI version was introduced after his succession to the throne in 1936 and has his effigy in coronation robes, facing left and circumscribed "GEORGIVS•VI•D•G•BR•OMN•REX•ET•INDIÆ•IMP•".
 The second King George VI version was introduced after 1947, when his title "Emperor of India" was abandoned and the reference to India was omitted from the medal inscription. The effigy on the obverse remained the same, but the circumscription was changed to "GEORGIVS VI DEI GRA BRITT: OMN: REX FID: DEF:".
  The first Queen Elizabeth II version was introduced after her succession to the throne in 1952. It has her crowned effigy, facing right, and is circumscribed "ELIZABETH II D: G: BR: OMN: REGINA F: D:", reading around from the top. The effigy was designed by sculptor Cecil Thomas OBE and was used on a number of medals.
 The second Queen Elizabeth II version was introduced after her coronation in 1953. This version has the same effigy as the first, but is circumscribed "ELIZABETH II DEI GRATIA REGINA F. D.", reading around from the top.

Reverse
The reverse shows the winged mythological goddess Pheme, with a trumpet in her left hand and rising from her throne to crown a warrior with a laurel wreath. At left is the naked and cloaked warrior, with his left foot on the throne dais, a bow and a quiver of arrows in his right hand and supporting a target with three arrows through its centre on his left knee. The design was by Sir Edward John Poynter, 1st Baronet PRA, and the original die was engraved by L.C. Wyon.

Clasp
The medal can be won multiple times. Each subsequent award is indicated by the award of another clasp, which displays the year of the subsequent award. The clasps are designed to be attached to the suspender and to each other with rivets, in roller chain fashion. When medals are not worn, the award of second and subsequent clasps are denoted by silver rosettes on the ribbon bar. Since it is impossible to sew more than four rosettes onto a single ribbon bar and since several champions have won the award more than five times, gold rosettes were introduced to cover situations where more than five championships have been won.

Ribbon	
The ribbon is 32 millimetres wide and dark crimson, with a 3 millimetres wide black band, a 3 millimetres wide beige band and a 3 millimetres wide black band on each edge.

References

Decorations of the British Army
Military awards and decorations of New Zealand
Sport in the British Army
Military decorations and medals of South Africa
Military decorations and medals of South Africa pre-1952
Military awards and decorations of Sri Lanka
Awards established in 1869